Stash is a compilation album from the rock band Phish containing songs from their 1988–1995 official releases. It was only released in Europe and was released to promote the band's 1996 spring tour of Europe, which included headlining shows along with opening shows for Santana.

Track listing

Personnel
Phish
Trey Anastasio – guitars, lead vocals
Page McConnell – keyboards, backing vocals
Mike Gordon – bass guitar, backing vocals, lead vocals on "Scent of a Mule"
Jon Fishman – drums, backing vocals

Additional musicians
Rose Stone - backing vocals on "Down with Disease"
Jean McClain - backing vocals on "Down with Disease"
Alison Krauss - additional vocals on "If I Could"
Gordon Stone - pedal steel guitar on "Fast Enough for You"
Dave Grippo - alto saxophone on "Split Open and Melt" and "Gumbo"
Russell B. Remmington - tenor saxophone on "Split Open and Melt"
Joseph Somerville Jr. - trumpet on "Split Open and Melt"
Christine Lynch - backing vocals on "Split Open and Melt"
Peter Apfelbaum - tenor saxophone on "Gumbo"
Carl Gerhard – trumpet on "Gumbo"
James Harvey – trombone on "Gumbo"
Michael Ray - trumpet on "Gumbo"

External links
Phish's official website

1996 compilation albums
Phish compilation albums
Elektra Records compilation albums